Avraham Toledano is an Israeli politician. He was the Mashgiach ruchani of the Yeshivat Haraayon Hayehudi, and was number four on the Kach Knesset list in 1988. He was briefly the leader of Kach after Rabbi Meir Kahane was murdered, and before Baruch Marzel took over.

Biography
Rabbi Toledano was born in Morocco, and educated in France. He has a black belt in judo, and lives in the Israeli settlement of Kiryat Arba.

References 

Living people
Israeli Kahanists
Moroccan emigrants to Israel
Mashgiach ruchani
Israeli Orthodox Jews
Religious Zionist Orthodox rabbis
Year of birth missing (living people)
Kach and Kahane Chai politicians
20th-century Moroccan Jews
Israeli settlers
Israeli male judoka
People from Kiryat Arba